Matthew 'Matt' Dawson (born 27 April 1994) is an Australian field hockey player who plays as a defender for the Australian national team. He competed at the 2016 Olympic Games in Rio de Janeiro and now the National team in the Tokyo 2020 olympic games.

Career
From Killarney Vale on the Central Coast region of New South Wales, Dawson is the son of former Australian cricketer Trish Dawson.  He was first selected to play for the Australia men's national field hockey team in 2014 against India. He has since played in the 2014 and 2016 Champions Trophy. In 2015 he was signed by the Kalinga Lancers in the Hockey India League.

Dawson was selected in the Kookaburras Olympics squad for the Tokyo 2020 Olympics. The team reached the final for the first time since 2004 but couldn't achieve gold, beaten by Belgium in a shootout.

References

External links
 
 
 
 

1994 births
Living people
Australian male field hockey players
Olympic field hockey players of Australia
Male field hockey defenders
Field hockey players at the 2016 Summer Olympics
Field hockey players at the 2018 Commonwealth Games
Field hockey players at the 2022 Commonwealth Games
2018 Men's Hockey World Cup players
People from the Central Coast (New South Wales)
Sportsmen from New South Wales
Commonwealth Games medallists in field hockey
Commonwealth Games gold medallists for Australia
Field hockey players at the 2020 Summer Olympics
Olympic silver medalists for Australia
Medalists at the 2020 Summer Olympics
Olympic medalists in field hockey
2023 Men's FIH Hockey World Cup players
Field hockey people from New South Wales
Medallists at the 2018 Commonwealth Games
Medallists at the 2022 Commonwealth Games